The Tamaulipas pygmy owl (Glaucidium sanchezi) is a species of owl in the family Strigidae.
It is endemic to Mexico. Its natural habitat is subtropical or tropical moist montane forests.

Description
The male has a brownish facial disc flecked with white and short white eyebrows. The upper parts are olive-brown, with a greyer crown and fine white speckling at the front and sides of the crown. The main wing and tail feathers are barred with white. The underparts are whitish with some reddish-brown streaking and mottling. The legs are feathered, the bill is yellowish-brown and the eyes yellow. The female is similar but has an overall more reddish-brown appearance.

Distribution
The Tamaulipas pygmy owl is endemic to Mexico where it is only found in the mountains of northeastern Mexico, in the northern part of the state of Hidalgo and the southeastern part of the state of San Luis Potosí.

Ecology
This owl is partly diurnal and feeds on insects and small vertebrates such as lizards. Little is known of its breeding habits but it generally chooses a hole in a tree previously used by a woodpecker. A clutch of up to four white eggs is laid and the young are able to fly soon after they emerge from the nest.

Status
At one time the International Union for Conservation of Nature rated the conservation status of the Tamaulipas pygmy owl as "least concern" but this has now been changed to "near-threatened". The forests in which this owl lives are being logged and the bird's range is now thought to be smaller than it was in the past. The population is also thought to be declining and is estimated to be fewer than 50,000 birds.

References

External links
Tamaulipas pygmy owl videos on the Internet Bird Collection
Tamaulipas pygmy owl photo gallery VIREO
Photo-High Res; Article borderland-tours

Glaucidium (owl)
Owl, Tamaulipas Pygmy
Birds described in 1949
Taxonomy articles created by Polbot
Birds of the Sierra Madre Oriental